Walston is an unincorporated community in Jefferson County, in the U.S. state of Pennsylvania.

History
Walston got its start circa 1883 when the Buffalo, Rochester and Pittsburgh Railway was extended to the coal mines located there. A post office has been in operation at Walston since 1885.

References

Unincorporated communities in Jefferson County, Pennsylvania
Unincorporated communities in Pennsylvania